Pablo John "PJ" Fiel Garcia (born May 19, 1967) is a Filipino lawyer and politician. He is a member of the National Unity Party and the One Cebu party

Early life and family 
Pablo John is the youngest child of former Governor, Congressman and Deputy Speaker Pablo P. Garcia and the late Judge Esperanza “Inday” Fiel-Garcia, who bore eight children. 

The eldest, Gwendolyn Garcia, is the incumbent Governor of the Province of Cebu, who also served as Congresswoman of the Third District from 2013 to 2019, after having served three terms as Governor of Cebu, from 2004 to 2013. His brother, Winston Garcia, is the former manager of the Government Service Insurance System (Philippines) and the official candidate of One Cebu for Governor on May 9, 2016. Another brother, Byron, is a former security consultant for the Cebu provincial government, and caught global attention in 2007  after directing inmates of the Cebu Provincial Detention and Rehabilitation Center (CPDRC) in the viral video of inmates dancing to the music of, "Thriller". Another brother, Marlon, is the incumbent Mayor of their hometown, Barili.

Garcia's father, Pablo, served three terms as governor of Cebu from 1995 to 2004, after having served as Congressman of the Third District of Cebu from 1987 to 1995. He then became Congressman of the Second District of Cebu from 2007 to 2013.

Education 
Pablo John finished elementary at the Cebu Sacred Heart School for Boys, and high school, at the University of the Philippines - Cebu High School (UP High), 1984, with gold medal for Journalism. At the Ateneo de Manila University, Pablo John became a Merit Scholar, in the Economics Honors Program, but he shifted to Philosophy, and graduated in 1989. In 1993, he graduated at the University of the Philippines College of Law and placed 4th in the 1993 Philippine Bar Examination with a rating of 86.5125%, as his father Pabling placed third in the 1951 bar exams, USC, 91.5%. While at UP, he was editor-in-chief of The Philippine Collegian from 1992 to 1993.

Legal career 
Pablo John, in 1995, worked as managing partner of Garcia Garcia Ong Vaño, the law firm Winston established. He handled the celebrated Batas Pambansa Blg. 22 case, "Lina Lim Lao versus The Court of Appeals, et al.", G.R. No. 119178, 30 June 1997. He then served as strategist, chief legal counsel, and consultant of Gwendolyn Garcia. He writes “Breakfast at Noon,” a Cebu Daily News column and later, at Sun.Star Cebu from 1998 to 2005.

Garcia & Garcia Law Offices is the law offices of Gov. Pablo P. Garcia and sons Winston Garcia and Pablo John Garcia.

Political career 
Garcia was elected to the House of Representatives of the Philippines in 2007 and 2010, representing the Third District of Cebu. In 2019, he ran as representative of the Third District of Cebu, winning in a field of three with 52% of the vote. He defeated former Senator John Henry Osmeña and former Pinamungajan Mayor Geraldine Yapha. On July 30, 2019, Pablo John was elected one of the deputy speakers of the 18th Congress under the leadership of Speaker Alan Peter Cayetano.

Personal life 
Pablo John is married to Karen  Flores; they have four children.

References

Notes

20th-century Filipino lawyers
1967 births
Living people
Ateneo de Manila University alumni
University of the Philippines alumni
Kabalikat ng Malayang Pilipino politicians
One Cebu politicians
Lakas–CMD politicians
Members of the House of Representatives of the Philippines from Cebu
National Unity Party (Philippines) politicians
Pablo John
Deputy Speakers of the House of Representatives of the Philippines